Ek Mutthi Aasmaan (English Title: A fistful of sky) is an Indian family drama television show. Neha Pandey was in charge of casting It aired on Zee TV. it was replaced by Bandhan.

Plot summary

Ek Mutthi Aasmaan follows the story of Kalpana "Kalpi" Jadhav and Raghav Singhania, as their paths cross on a journey of self improvement. Kalpi is the daughter of a maid, Kamla Jadhav, and a mill worker, Vitthal Jadhav (Mohit Dagga). Her mother's dream is to become a part of the middle class so she works tirelessly. Kalpana selflessly loves her mother, but is deprived of her love and attention because Kamla is always busy looking after family members of her employers, mostly Pakhi Kapoor (Shirina Singh).

Raghav Singhania is a rich businessman whose mission is to take revenge from the Kapoors who murdered his father. Raghav has always been in debt to Kamla as she helped him escape from the Kapoors who wanted to adopt him and take away all his wealth. He becomes attracted to Kalpi's sweet, simple and caring nature and falls in love with her. Eventually, Kalpana recognizes Raghav's feelings and reciprocates. Raghav and Kalpana fall in love, and with the blessing of their parents, plan their wedding.

On the day of his wedding to Kalpi, Raghav marries Pakhi Kapoor instead. Eventually, Raghav realizes his mistake but cannot rectify it because his mother, Gauri, wants him to use his marriage to Pakhi in her plans against the Kapoors. In order to prove his love for Kalpi, he marries her by putting the sindoor on her forehead in a temple.

Paakhi hires goons to kidnap Kalpi and keep her in a remote location. Later, Raghav learns where Paakhi is hiding Kalpi and rescues her. A car chase ensues in which the car drives off a cliff and blows up. Some fishermen find Kalpi in the river and take her to a hospital; Raghav is still missing. While in the hospital, Dhiraj Diwan is depressed over his niece Suhana's (Asha Negi) death. When he hears how Kalpi's face has been burned and that she has lost her memory, he requests the doctor to perform a plastic surgery procedure to make Kalpi look like Suhana. The surgery is successful. Suhana has flashbacks of her real family, the accident and struggles to believe she is indeed Suhana Diwan.

On the day Suhana is to marry Aryan (Kunal Varma), she realizes that she is Kalpi and she marries Raghav instead.

Cast

 Rachna Parulkar / Asha Negi as Kalpana Raghav Singhania "Kalpi", Raghav's wife and childhood friend 
 Mehnaaz Maan as young Kalpi
 Ashish Chaudhary as Raghav Singhania, Kalpana's husband and childhood friend
 Yatin Mehta as young Raghav
 Shilpa Shirodhkar as Kamla Vitthal Jadhav, Kalpi's mother
 Mohit Dagga as Vitthal Jadhav, Kalpi's father
 Shirina Sambyal as Pakhi Kapoor
 Avneet Kaur as young Pakhi
 Ashish Nayyar as Sahil Kapoor, Pakhi's father
 Tuhina Vohra as Neetu Kapoor, Pakhi's mother
 Jyoti Gauba as Gauri Singhania, Raghav's mother
 Siddhant Agarwal as Pakhya Jadhav, Kalpi's brother
 Suman Shashi Kant as Manda Tai
 Neeraj Malviya as Prem Kapoor, Pakhi's brother
 Jasmine Avasia as Rajji Kapoor
 Ishaan Singh Manhas as Samar "Sammy" Raizada, Raghav's friend and business partner 
 Asha Negi as Suhana Diwan
 Siraj Mustafa Khan as Dheeraj Dhawan, Suhana's brother
 Kajal Pisal as Maya
 Shweta Gautam as Kavita Diwan
 Rohit Sagar as Sanjay Diwan
 Kunal Verma as Aryan, Suhana's love interest
 Ahmad Harhash as Raghav Diwan

References

External links 

Indian television soap operas
Zee TV original programming
Hindi-language television shows
Indian drama television series
2013 Indian television series debuts
2014 Indian television series endings